Heterops loreyi is a species of beetle in the family Cerambycidae. It was described by Philogène Auguste Joseph Duponchel in 1837.

References

Heteropsini
Beetles described in 1837